Garrick Rennie Porteous (born 17 January 1990) is an English professional golfer who won The Amateur Championship in 2013 where he defeated Toni Hakula 6 and 5. In 2017 he won the Prague Golf Challenge on the Challenge Tour.

College career
Porteous played on the golf team at the University of Tennessee where he earned all-conference and all-region honors.

Amateur career
Porteous won the 2013 Amateur Championship where he defeated Toni Hakula, 6 & 5.  This win earned him entry into the 2013 Open Championship, 2014 Masters Tournament, and the 2014 U.S. Open provided he maintained his amateur status. He also won the 2013 Scottish Amateur Stroke Play Championship and was runner-up in the 2013 Welsh Strokeplay Championship

Professional career
Porteous turned professional after the 2014 Masters, forfeiting his spot in the U.S. Open. He made his professional debut at the Maybank Malaysian Open.

Since turning professional, Porteous has mainly played on the Challenge Tour. In July 2017, he won the Prague Golf Challenge by 5 strokes. His previous best finish had been joint runner-up in the 2016 Red Sea Egyptian Challenge. He qualified for the main European Tour for 2020 by finishing 14th in qualifying school.

Amateur wins
2013 Amateur Championship

Professional wins (2)

Challenge Tour wins (1)

PGA EuroPro Tour wins (1)

Results in major championships

 

CUT = missed the half-way cut
"T" = tied

Team appearances
Amateur
Eisenhower Trophy (representing England): 2012
St Andrews Trophy (representing Great Britain & Ireland): 2012
European Amateur Team Championship (representing England): 2013 (winners)
Walker Cup (representing Great Britain & Ireland): 2013

See also
2019 European Tour Qualifying School graduates
2022 European Tour Qualifying School graduates

References

External links

English male golfers
European Tour golfers
Sportspeople from Colchester
1990 births
Living people